A mainframe computer is a type of large data processing system.

Mainframe may also refer to:
 Mainframe Entertainment, a Canadian computer animation company that has alternated (3 times) under the Rainmaker banner due to majority interests acquisitions
 Either of two fictional Marvel Comics characters:
 Mainframe (comics), from the series A-Next
 Mainframe, a character from the Guardians of the Galaxy series
 Mainframe (G.I. Joe), a character in the G.I. Joe universe
 A character from the game Gunman Chronicles
 Mainframe, the city in which the animated series ReBoot takes place
 Tina "Mainframe" Cassidy, a character from COPS (animated TV series)
 A character in Gene Wolfe's novel/series The Book of the Long Sun